Hillel Yeshiva is a private Modern Orthodox Jewish day school located in Ocean Township, in Monmouth County, New Jersey, United States. It provides an integrated pre-nursery through twelfth grade program that facilitates the study of both Judaic and secular studies.

As of the 2017–18 school year, the school had an enrollment of 621 students (plus 98 in PreK) and 99.5 classroom teachers (on an FTE basis), for a student–teacher ratio of 6.2:1. The school's student body was 100% White.

The school has been accredited by the Middle States Association of Colleges and Schools Commission on Elementary and Secondary Schools since 2011. Hillel Yeshiva, Middle States Association of Colleges and Schools Commission on Elementary and Secondary Schools.

References

External links

National Center for Education Statistics data for Hillel Yeshiva

Jewish day schools in New Jersey
Modern Orthodox Jewish day schools in the United States
Modern Orthodox Judaism in New Jersey
Ocean Township, Monmouth County, New Jersey
Private elementary schools in New Jersey
Private high schools in Monmouth County, New Jersey
Private middle schools in New Jersey
Orthodox yeshivas in New Jersey